Sheffield Inner Ring Road is a dual-carriageway circling central Sheffield, South Yorkshire, England. Marked up as the A61 all the way around, it was built from the 1960s onwards. The Ring Road connects to the Sheffield Parkway, which itself connects with the M1 motorway. Many of Sheffield's current and under construction major office premises and luxury apartments are located on the Ring Road.

Route

It is formed mostly from the north–south A61, coming in from Chesterfield as the Unstone-Dronfield Bypass, Chesterfield Road South, Meadowhead, Chesterfield Road, London Road and Queens Road, joining the ring road itself at Suffolk Road. The A57 (as The Parkway) approaches Sheffield from the east (M1 jct 33) and arrives at Park Square Roundabout, the start of the ring road. Travelling clockwise, the ring road consists of Sheaf Street, Sheaf Square, Suffolk Road (anticlockwise) and Shoreham Street (clockwise), St Mary's Road, St Mary's Gate, Hannover Way, Upper Hannover Street, Netherthorpe Road and Hoyle Street, terminating at Shalesmoor, where the A61 turns north-west the Sheffield's northern suburbs and onto Barnsley. The South portion of the inner ring road follows most of the course of the B6070 before the dual-carriageway sections were built. The B6070 now only applies to Granville Road and Rutland Road at either ends of the southern portion of the ring road.

Northern Relief Road
The Sheffield Northern Relief Road is the scheme closing a hole in the Inner Ring Road. Work began in 1999, with phase 1 finished in 2000 as Cutlers Gate and was subsequently renamed late in 2008 as Derek Dooley Way, in honour of the late Sheffielder who played football for Sheffield Wednesday before breaking his leg and going on to perform a number of backroom roles across the city at Sheffield United.  Derek Dooley Way named section runs from the Parkway to the Wicker. In 2005 work started on the remainder, closing the gap from there to Shalesmoor and ended at the end of 2007. This section goes from Shalesmoor, down Moorfields, turning north at the junction with Gibraltar Street via a newly built road, meeting Corporation Street. It then crosses a new bridge before making its way to the Wicker through what was disused factories. There, at Junction 9, Bridgehouses, the road diverges, with part linking up to the Cutlers Gate section as described to join the Parkway where motorists may then turn right to continue on the ring road to Park Square and part heads underneath the viaduct and links to Spital Hill, Savile Street and Burngreave Road for connections to Attercliffe, Carbrook and the northeast of Sheffield at Meadowhall Centre/Tinsley. Nursery Street, the Wicker and Exchange Place were downgraded as part of the project.

Junctions

For an explanation of the Quarters, see Sheffield City Centre's Quarters

In popular culture
American musician Rodney Crowell refers to the Ring Road in the song Glasgow Girl on his 2005 album The Outsider.  In it the singer states "I'm stuck out on the Ring Road...if I don't find my way around soon I'm sure to end up lost.  Sheffield has that certain mix of danger and despair; I need to roll these windows down and breathe the cool night air."

References

Roads in Sheffield
Streets in Sheffield
Ring roads in the United Kingdom